I Have a Right is Gloria Gaynor's seventh studio album, released in 1979. The track, "Let Me Know (I Have a Right)", was released as a single and reached #42 on the Billboard Hot 100. The album has never been released on CD.

Reception
AllMusic called the opening track "Let me Know" a "a very weak and contrived start" and "a poor person's "I Will Survive"". However, "the rest of the material is excellent. From both a disco standpoint and a Northern soul standpoint, I Have a Right is a welcome addition to Gaynor's catalog."

Smash Hits, however,  said, "A desperately dull collection of over orchestrated nightclub songs, an out of date rhythm machine and a struggling soul singer bring you every disco cliché in the book without a shred of originality or personality to rescue it. Formula dance music for computers."

Track listing

Personnel 
 Gloria Gaynor - lead vocals
 Bob Bowles, Wah Wah Watson - guitar
 Pete Robinson - keyboards, synthesizer
 David Shields, Freddie Washington - bass guitar
 Freddie Perren - keyboards
 Bob Zimmitti - percussion
 Paulinho Da Costa - congas
 James Gadson - drums
 Doc Severinsen - trumpet
 Katie Kirkpatrick - harp
 Julia Waters, Maxine Waters, Marti McCall - backing vocals

References

External links
 

1978 albums
Gloria Gaynor albums
Albums produced by Freddie Perren
Polydor Records albums